Porcu may refer to:

Aureliu Porcu, player of the Sardinian launeddas
 rivers in Romania:
 Porcu, a tributary of the Bâsculița in Buzău County
 Valea Porcului, a tributary of the Sădurel in Sibiu County
 Porcu, a tributary of the Tărâia in Gorj County
 Porcu (Jiu), a tributary of the Jiu in Gorj County

See also
Porcula, a genus of Suidae
Porcus (disambiguation)